Limitless is the twelfth studio album (36th overall) by American singer/songwriter and record producer/arranger Richard Marx, released on February 7, 2020. It is his first studio album since 2014. It was the first time Marx had recorded an album without the conscious thought of making an album.

Development
Marx usually produces his albums by himself but this time, he worked with several different producers, all of whom also co-wrote a majority of the songs on the album as well. His son Lucas was one of the producers who also co-wrote two of the tracks, including the single "Another One Down".

"I wasn't really sure what making a new album meant for an artist like me," Marx said of the creative process behind Limitless. "All I knew was that I still write songs all the time and I realised I had a collection of songs I really liked. In my past, my only criteria were to write and record songs that pleased me, and hopefully other people would like them, too. So I returned to that ideology and dismissed any concerns of stylistic consistency and the next thing I knew, I had recorded a diverse album I really liked."

The album was dedicated to his wife Daisy Fuentes.

Chart performance
Limitless became Marx's first studio album to chart overseas since 2004's My Own Best Enemy.

"Another One Down" was released several months prior to the album and peaked at No. 14 on the Adult Contemporary chart.

Track listing

Personnel 
 Richard Marx – lead vocals, backing vocals, acoustic piano, keyboards, synth bass, acoustic guitar
 Ross Copperman – instrumentation, programming
 Michael Jade – instrumentation, keyboards, programming, guitars, backing vocals
 Lucas Marx – instrumentation, programming, arrangements 
 Morgan Page – synthesizers, programming
 Jason Webb – keyboards
 Jerry McPherson – guitars
 Matt Scannell – acoustic guitar, guitars, bass, drum programming
 Mark Hill – bass
 Steve Brewster – drums
 Jana Kramer – lead vocals (8)

Production 
 Production – Ross Copperman, Michael Jade, Lucas Marx, Richard Marx, Morgan Page, David Pramik, and Matt Scannell
 Mixing – Michael Jade, Lucas Marx, Chip Matthews, and Mat Prock
 Mastering – Mat Prock
 Art Direction – Paula Scher
 Design – Dale Voelker
 Photography – Mike Helfrich

Charts

See also
List of 2020 albums

References

2020 albums
Richard Marx albums
Albums produced by Richard Marx